Government  Muhammadan Anglo Oriental College (abbreviated to  Govt. M.A.O. College Lahore; ;) is a public college located adjacent to Civil Secretariat Lahore. It is among the oldest educational institutions in Lahore, Punjab, Pakistan. It was established in 1933 as MAO College by Anjuman-e-Islamia at Amritsar and Professor S. Mercado was appointed the first principal. It had played a significant role in the creation of Pakistan. After the independence of Pakistan in 1947, the college was shifted to Lahore, in the building of a Hindu established college, Sanatan Dharma College, which was in turn shifted to Ambala, Haryana after partition. 

Government M.A.O. College stands towering among the comparable institutions in providing education of a high standard at Higher Secondary School Certificate, Undergraduate, and Postgraduate levels. This college is offering its students opportunities for overall development, amid a disciplined and peaceful environment in multiple phases.

The college has an enviable atmosphere not only conducive to academic pursuits but also fruitful for co-curricular and extra-curricular activities with emphasis on sports. There are many literary, Science and cultural societies contributing to the balanced personality development of the future generations of Pakistan. The college thus provides ample opportunities for the students to discover themselves, realize their potentials and prepare for the challenges of life.

During more than eighty years of its history, the college has left indelible imprints in every phase of human life. The alumni of the college have won laurels not only for their alma mater but served the country in different capacities in almost all spheres of life.

History

In 1933, MAO College was established by the Anjuman-e-Islamia in Amritsar on the pattern of the MAO College Aligarh to overcome the deficiencies of modern education in local Muslims. Professor S. Mercado was appointed the first principal. At the time of Partition, most of the college staff and students migrated to Lahore, where a new MAO College was established with the same pattern and mostly same staff, in the former Sanatan Dharma College premises, which in turn moved to Ambala.

The college reached the heights of glory in the headship of Dr M.D. Taseer, and Sahibzada Mahmuduzaffar, an Oxford graduate & a renowned Marxist. Faiz Ahmed Faiz, the leftist poet, was also a lecturer in English at this college. Professor Dilawar Hussain, Professor Karamat Hussain Jafari and Professor Maksud ul Hassan Bokhari also contributed to adding grace and glory to this illustrious institution.

Academics
MAO College is organized into two divisions, the science and arts division. These divisions are further categorized as academic departments. The core departments include Commerce, Information Technology (I.T.), Chemistry, English, Physics, Mathematics, Mass Communication, Philosophy, Psychology, Statistics, and Social Work.

The college offers the Bachelor of Commerce (B.Com.), Bachelor of Business Administration (BBA), Bachelor of Science (B.S.) Physics, Psychology, English, Mathematics, I.T., Mass Communication, and BS Chemistry degrees at the undergraduate level, and the Master of Arts (M.A.) in English Literature, Urdu, Economics, Mass Communication, Master of Science (M.Sc.) in Mathematics, and M.Sc. Applied Psychology degrees at the graduate level.

There are separate blocks for each level of education. For example, Kramat Block is associated with the Intermediate level, Commerce Block hosts undergraduate students and Postgraduate Block is devoted to Masters Classes. Dilwar Block and Physics Block are currently in the renovation process and are not operational yet. The college has a state of the art, multimedia enriched Auditorium, which is often used to organize different events.

Programs Offered
Govt. M.A.O. College Lahore is currently offering educational programs at three levels (Intermediate, Undergraduate, and Postgraduate):

Intermediate
MAO College offers Intermediate programs only for boys and there is no co-education at this level. College offers:
 F.A.
 F.Sc. (Pre-Medical)
 F.Sc. (Pre-Engineering)
 G.Sc.
 I.Com
 I.C.S (Physics)
 I.C.S (Statistics)

Undergraduate
Govt. M.A.O. College Lahore provides BS Honors (4-Year) co-education program at the undergraduate level. College is affiliated with University of the Punjab which has allowed these programs:
 BBA
 B.Com.
 BS Chemistry
 BS Economics
 BS English
 BS Information Technology
 BS Mathematics
 BS Mass Communication
 BS Physics
 BS Psychology

Postgraduate

The college offers the following co-education postgraduate programs:
 M.A. yeryey
 M.A. English
 M.A. Mass Communication
 M.A. Urdu
 M.Sc. Mathematics
 M.Sc. Applied Psychology

College magazine
College magazine “IQRA” is published annually under the supervision of College Magazine and Publication Committee with English, Urdu and 
Punjabi sections to explore the literary potentials of the students through their writings. Due to undisclosed reasons magazine could not be published in the three years (from 2010 to 2013). However, last Principal Prof. Rashid Najeeb took the responsibility and it was due to his efforts that “IQRA” was published again in 2014.

Sports
MAO College is also well known for co-curricular, extracurricular, and sports activities. College students often take part in College, Board, and University level competitions. Cricket, Field Hockey, and Football teams are major representations of Govt. M.A.O. College in the sports fields. The college's alumni include many national players like Saeed Ajmal, Saqlain Mushtaq, Taufeeq Umar, and Salman Akbar.

Notable alumni
Alumni of Govt. M.A.O. College Lahore include:

Literature and Arts
 Atta-ul-Haq Qasmi (Poet, Columnist, Journalist)
 Amjad Islam Amjad (Poet)
 Masood Akhtar (Actor)

Politics
 Khawaja Saad Rafique (Former Minister for Pakistan Railways, Politician, Member of PML - N)

References

External links
 Govt. M.A.O College Lahore at Pakistan National Digital Library

Educational institutions established in 1933
Academic institutions in Pakistan
Universities and colleges in Lahore
1933 establishments in India